Stolen Life is a 1939 British drama film directed by Paul Czinner and starring Michael Redgrave, Elisabeth Bergner and Wilfrid Lawson.

Production
The film was made at Pinewood Studios with location filming in Cornwall, the South of France and the Dolomites in Italy. It was adapted from a novel by Karel J. Benes and was remade in 1946 as A Stolen Life. The film score was composed by William Walton. The film's sets were by the art director John Bryan, while the costumes were designed by Joe Strassner.

The film was re-released in 1942 during the Second World War. It premiered in France in 1946 and in 1951 in West Germany. Czinner and Bergner had been forced to leave Germany following the Nazi takeover in 1933 and their films were banned there.

Synopsis
After meeting and apparently falling in love with Martina, a young woman he meets in Switzerland, mountaineer Alan MacKenzie instead marries her more forceful twin sister Sylvina. Later, while he is away leading an expedition to conquer a previously unclimbable mountain in Tibet, the two sisters holiday in Brittany. After Sylvina is drowned in a sailing accident, Martina is mistaken for her after being rescued from the water clutching her sister's wedding ring. Deciding to impersonate her dead sister, she finds that Sylvina had been carrying on an affair with another man and planned to divorce Alan. After Alan arrives in Athens with his team, having successfully climbed the mountain, the couple embrace after he discovers her true identity.

Cast
 Elisabeth Bergner as Sylvina Lawrence / Martina Lawrence  
 Michael Redgrave as Alan MacKenzie  
 Wilfrid Lawson as Thomas E. Lawrence  
 Mabel Terry-Lewis as Aunt Helen 
 Richard Ainley as Morgan  
 Kenneth Milne-Buckley as Garrett  
 Daniel Mendaille as Old Pauliac  
 Pierre Juvenet as Doctor  
 Stella Arbenina as Nurse  
 Kaye Seeley as Maturin  
 Ernest Ferny as Superintendent Demangeon  
 Cot D'Ordan as Clerk  
 Dorice Fordred as Eileen, Sylvina's Maid  
 Annie Esmond as Cook  
 Clement McCallin as Karal Anderson  
 Oliver Johnston as Professor Bardesley  
 Roy Russell as British Minister  
 Homer Regus as Mayor

References

Bibliography
 Goble, Alan. The Complete Index to Literary Sources in Film. Walter de Gruyter, 1999.

External links

1939 films
Films shot at Pinewood Studios
Films scored by William Walton
Films about twin sisters
British black-and-white films
British drama films
1939 drama films
Paramount Pictures films
Films shot in Cornwall
Films shot in France
Films shot in Italy
Films set in Switzerland
Films about Tibet
Films set in England
Films set in Brittany
Films set in Athens
Films based on Czech novels
1930s English-language films
Films directed by Paul Czinner
1930s British films